Trichilia breviflora is a species of plant in the family Meliaceae. It is found in Mexico, Belize, Guatemala, and Honduras.

References

Flora of Belize
Flora of Guatemala
Flora of Honduras
breviflora
Endangered plants
Taxonomy articles created by Polbot